Hugo Lous Mohr (27 September 1889 – 20 February 1970) was a Norwegian painter.

Biography
He was born in Mandal in Vest-Agder, Norway. He was the son of Olaf Eugen Mohr (1856–1933) and Jeanette Lous (1860–1942). His father was a vicar at the missionary school operated by the Norwegian Missionary Society in Stavanger. He was a brother of architect Bjarne Lous Mohr and physician Otto Lous Mohr, and brother-in-law of physician Tove Mohr. He graduated from Stavanger Cathedral School in Kongsgård during 1907. He was a student of artist Henrik Sørensen in Kristiania (now Oslo) from 1916-18.

He  conducted study trips to  Paris 1918-21 and 1924–25, Spain and Italy  1920; Germany and Italy 1921-22; The Netherlands and Belgium in 1924 and 1945; Italy 1939 and 1948.

Mohr received several assignments with religious motives, including the ceiling decorations at Oslo Cathedral (1935–49), restoration on the   war damaged Kristiansand Cathedral (1945) and decorating the vault at Vår Frelsers gravlund (1935–50). He completed the frescoes at Johanneskirken in Bergen  (1923–24) and at the rebuilt Volda Church (1932).   He also decorated  altarpieces for Ris Church (1932), Vang Church  in Hedmark (1955), Dale Church in Vaksdal (1958) and  Olav Chapel in Sandefjord  (1962).

Several of his paintings are located in the National Gallery of Norway. He was decorated Commander of the Order of St. Olav in 1955.

Selected works
Portrett av Fartein Valen, Valevåg (1917)
Kristus-hode, Chartres 	(1921)
Frosset fjell, Volda (1927) 
Bjart, kunstnerens sønn	(1930)
Korsfestelsen. Skisse til dekorasjon i Volda kirke 	(1932) 
Skjærgård 	(1936)
Fra Rauland (1941)
Sommer (1956)

References

1889 births
1970 deaths
People from Mandal, Norway
Fresco painters
19th-century Norwegian painters
20th-century Norwegian painters
Norwegian male painters
19th-century Norwegian male artists
20th-century Norwegian male artists